Troy Garity (born July 7, 1973) is an American film actor. He is primarily known for his role as Isaac in the Barbershop film series and as Barry Winchell  in the television movie Soldier's Girl (2003), where he was nominated for a Golden Globe Award for Best Actor – Miniseries or Television Film.

Early life, family and education

Garity was born in Los Angeles, California, to actress/activist Jane Fonda and activist/politician Tom Hayden. His parents gave him the last name Garity, the surname of his paternal grandmother.  He grew up in Santa Monica. His half-sister is director and cinematographer Vanessa Vadim.

Through his mother, Garity is the grandson of New York socialite Frances Ford Seymour and actor Henry Fonda, and a nephew of actor Peter Fonda. His cousins include actress Bridget Fonda. His father is of Irish descent and his mother's ancestry includes Dutch, English, French, German, and Irish.

Garity made his first onscreen appearance as an infant, when his parents carried him through their Vietnam travelogue, Introduction to the Enemy (1974). He began acting as a child at Santa Barbara's Laurel Springs Camp for the Arts. He made an uncredited appearance in the film On Golden Pond (1981), trained at the American Academy of Dramatic Arts in NYC, and became a member of the Academy Repertory Company, performing in a number of stage productions.

Career
Garity has appeared in numerous film productions. He played his father in the film Steal This Movie (2000) based on the life of Yippie founder Abbie Hoffman. His portrayal of Isaac Rosenberg in the film Barbershop (2002) proved to be his breakout role, and he reprised it in Barbershop 2: Back in Business (2004) and Barbershop: The Next Cut (2016) – though in the latter, his role is significantly reduced to a cameo appearance. He also starred as Harvey in the Danny Boyle/Alex Garland film Sunshine (2007) and as the tormented survivor of a tragic family accident in Lake City (2008).

In 1998, Garity was named one of People magazine's "50 Most Beautiful People".

Honors
For his portrayal of Barry Winchell in the film Soldier's Girl (2003), Garity earned a Golden Globe nomination for Best Actor in a Miniseries or a Motion Picture Made for Television and in 2002 he won the Young Hollywood Award for a Standout Performance.

Personal life
On August 27, 2007, Garity married actress Simone Bent at Columbia University's St. Paul's Chapel. Garity is the founder of the Peace Process Network, an international gang violence prevention coalition, and he is the chairman of Homies Unidos, a gang violence prevention group in Los Angeles.

Filmography

References

External links
 
 E! network profile
 Fonda Family Genealogy

1973 births
Living people
American male film actors
American male television actors
Male actors from Los Angeles
Fonda family
20th-century American male actors
21st-century American male actors